The Bolebroke Castle Miniature Railway or Bolebroke Castle and Lakes Railway (often abbreviated to BC&LR) was a  railway that ran within the grounds of Bolebroke Castle. The railway closed in 2012 after the owner's passing, and the stock/track was distributed to volunteers and new owners.

References

7¼ in gauge railways in England
Hartfield